Charles "Tod" Daley, (July 27, 1890 – August 10, 1976) was a Canadian politician. He served in the Legislative Assembly of Ontario from 1943 to 1963 as a member of the Progressive Conservative Party, and was a cabinet minister in the governments of George Drew, Thomas, and Leslie Frost.

Background
Daley was born in St. Catharines in 1890.  He served in the First World War.

Politics
He was elected alderman of St. Catharines in 1935 and later became mayor of the city.

He was elected to the Ontario legislature in the 1943 provincial election in the local southwestern Ontario riding of Lincoln. Two weeks after the election he was appointed to George Drew's Cabinet as Minister of Labour.

He served in that role for the next 18 years through three successive premiers. When John Robarts took power in 1961 he was retained in Cabinet as a Minister without portfolio. He retired before the 1963 election.

Cabinet positions

Later life
After retiring from politics he served on the Niagara Parks Commission and the Niagara Falls Bridge Commission. He died in hospital in Toronto, Ontario at age 85.

References

External links

1890 births
1976 deaths
Mayors of St. Catharines
Progressive Conservative Party of Ontario MPPs
Canadian military personnel of World War I
Canadian carpenters
Canadian military personnel from Ontario
Canadian Army personnel